Bald Eagle was a clipper ship launched in 1852 which made four round-trip passages from eastern U.S. ports before being lost on her fifth voyage in the Pacific ocean in 1861. She set the record, 78 days 22 hours, for the fastest passage of a fully loaded ship between San Francisco and New York.

Her voyages

The Bald Eagle'''s voyages are listed here. Sources disagree on some departure and arrival dates and passage lengths; disagreements or ambiguities are individually cited. City names are entered as spelled at the time.

 Her fate 
Although Basil Lubbock wrote an account that in October 1861 Bald Eagle came under attack by Chinese pirates while en route to Peru with a cargo of Chinese laborers, was put on fire, and then abandoned at sea some 500 miles east of Manila, there is little evidence to support his account. Richard McKay calls it a "fake yarn" and cites F. C. Matthews, a "well-known authority of ships...of the past" that Bald Eagle'' sailed from Hong Kong for San Francisco with a cargo including rice, sugar, tea, and "treasure" and was never heard of again.

References

See also
List of clipper ships

Ships built in Boston
Ships designed by Donald McKay
Extreme clippers